The Landsberg family is a noble family originating from Westphalia, whose members settled in Courland and later in Lithuania and Poland.

The earliest mention of the family dates back to the 11th century, they trace their roots to a ministerialis who lived in 1055 at the Werden Abbey. Two members of the family, Wilhelm von Landsberg and Johann von Landsberg, arrived in Courland in the 16th century, where they received the fief estate of Wiexeln. Wilhelm's male descendants lived in Courland until 1820.Johann von Landsberg's descendant, Eduard Eberhard (Ewarni) Landsberg (1625-1652) settled in Lithuania where he acquired the estates in the Vilnius voivodeship. Johann had one son Georg, who in turn had two sons Rafał (born 1715) and Bogusław (born 1717), both of whom left numerous offspring. The family sprawled out and did not play a major role in local politics, nor was it characterized by great wealth, holding several, often divided estates in Lithuania and Samogitia: Albrychtów, Stare Linkowo, Tryszkany, Węgryszki, Judejki and others. Only Tomasz, great-grandson of Rafał Landsberg, who married Marcjanella Kierbedź, came to greater prominence. His son Stanisław married Salomea Szemiot, through which he came into possession of the large estate of Šiaulėnai. The second of Tomasz's sons Wacław owned  married Malwina Römer, through which he came into possession of Terliszki. Only then did the Landsbergs become a substantial landowning family.
Another prominent representative of the family was Gabrielius Landsbergis-Žemkalnis, an activist in the Lithuanian national revival. He came from the impoverished part of the family; his father was Wincenty Ananiasz, son of Kazimierz Ignacy and grandson of mentioned earlier Rafał Landsberg. The descendants of Gabrielus and his brother Kazimierz were prominent figures in the Lithuanian state. Gabrielus' grandson Vytautas Landsbergis was the founder in 1988 of the Lithuanian independence movement Sąjūdis.

See also
Landsberg, list of people with the surname

References

Bibliography